The 2014 European Badminton Championships were the 24th tournament of the European Badminton Championships. They were held in Kazan, Russia, from April 23 to April 27, 2014. The competitions were held in the Gymnastics Center.

Medalists

Men's singles

Seeds

Wild cards

Finals

Section 1

Section 2

Section 3

Section 4

Women's singles

Seeds

Finals

Section 1

Section 2

Section 3

Section 4

Men's doubles

Seeds
 Mathias Boe/Carsten Mogensen
 Chris Adcock/Andrew Ellis
 Vladimir Ivanov/Ivan Sozonov
 Mads Conrad-Petersen/Mads Pieler Kolding

Finals

Section 1

Section 2

Women's doubles

Seeds
 Christinna Pedersen / Kamilla Rytter Juhl
 Eefje Muskens / Selena Piek
 Line Damkjaer Kruse / Marie Roepke
 Imogen Bankier / Petya Nedelcheva

Finals

Sector 1

Sector 2

Mixed doubles

Seeds
 Joachim Fischer Nielsen / Christinna Pedersen
 Chris Adcock / Gabrielle Adcock
 Michael Fuchs / Birgit Michels
 Robert Blair / Imogen Bankier

Finals

Sector 1

Sector 2

External links
European Championships 2014 at tournamentsoftware.com

European Badminton Championships
European Badminton Championships
International sports competitions hosted by Russia
Sport in Kazan
21st century in Kazan
2014 in Russian sport
Badminton tournaments in Russia
April 2014 sports events in Russia